Norman John McLennan (17 February 1887 – 21 March 1909) was an Australian rules footballer who played with Fitzroy in the Victorian Football League (VFL).

He was the older brother of Fitzroy player Harold McLennan.

Notes

External links 

1887 births
1909 deaths
Australian rules footballers from Victoria (Australia)
Fitzroy Football Club players